Panskura Paschim Assembly constituency is an assembly constituency in Purba Medinipur district in the Indian state of West Bengal.

Overview
As per orders of the Delimitation Commission, No. 205 Panskura Paschim Assembly constituency is composed of the following: Panskura CD Block.

Panskura Paschim Assembly constituency is part of No. 32 Ghatal (Lok Sabha constituency). It was earlier part of Panskura (Lok Sabha constituency).

Members of Legislative Assembly

Election results

2021 election

2016 election

.# Swing calculated on Left Front+Congress vote percentages taken together in 2016.

2011

  

.# Swing calculated on Congress+Trinamool Congress vote percentages taken together in 2006.

1977-2006
In the 2006, 2001 and 1996 state assembly elections Chittaranjan Das Thakur of CPI won the Panskura West assembly seat defeating his nearest rivals  Jaidul Khan of Trinamool Congress in 2006, and Jakiur Rahman Khan of Trinamool Congress/ Congress in 2001 and 1996. Contests in most years were multi cornered but only winners and runners are being mentioned. Omar Ali of CPI defeated Sk. Golam Murshed of Congress in 1991, Asit Baran Samanta of Congress in 1987, Jyoti Kumar Roy of Congress in 1982, and Jyoti Kumar Roy of Janata Party in 1977.

1951-1972
Sk. Omar Ali of CPI won in 1972 and 1971. Ahindra Mishra of Bangla Congress won in 1969. R.K.Pramanik of Bangla Congress won in 1967. Shymadas Bhattacharya of Congress won in 1962 and 1957. In independent India's first election in 1951, the two seats at Panskura were named Panskura North and Panskura South. While Shyamadas Bhattacharya of Congress won the Panskura South seat, Rajanikanta Pramanik won the Panskura North seat.

References

Assembly constituencies of West Bengal
Politics of Purba Medinipur district